Michael Polchlopek (born December 27, 1965) is an American retired professional wrestler and former mixed martial artist. He is best known for his appearances with the World Wrestling Federation (WWF) from 1993 to 1999 under the ring names Bart Gunn and Bodacious Bart, as well as his appearances with All Japan Pro Wrestling (AJPW) from 1998 to 2002 and with New Japan Pro-Wrestling (NJPW) from 2002 to 2004 as Mike Barton.

Early life
Michael Polchlopek was born on December 27, 1965, in Titusville, Florida. He was a big fan of wrestling, often watching Florida Championship Wrestling and enjoyed seeing Eddie & Mike Graham and  Jack & Gerald Brisco.

Professional wrestling career

Early career (1991–1993)

Polchlopek was trained to wrestle by Caesar Barraza, Blackjack Mulligan, Tim Parker and Boris Malenko. He made his debut in 1991.

In 1992, Polchlopek (wrestling as "Brett Colt") formed a tag team with Kip Winchester in the Tampa, Florida-based International Championship Wrestling Alliance known as "The Long Riders".

World Wrestling Federation (1993–1999)

Smoking Gunns (1993–1996)

Polchlopek was perhaps most famous in the World Wrestling Federation as one-half of the tag team The Smoking Gunns with his kayfabe brother Billy Gunn. The team won the Tag Team Championship three times before breaking up and engaging in a brief feud in October 1996. Bart Gunn briefly went into solo competition, his most high-profile match occurring on Monday Night Raw, in April 1996, which he lost to "Ringmaster" Steve Austin via the Million Dollar Dream.

Singles competitor (1996–1997)
Gunn feuded with Billy Gunn during the fall of 1996 which ended after he defeated Billy on the December 16th episode of Monday Night Raw. His most notable victory was scoring an upset victory over Triple H by disqualification on Superstars. He also participated in the 1997 Royal Rumble match. Gunn would later become a jobber in 1997 losing to the likes of Faarooq, Triple H, Ahmed Johnson and Vader.  His final match in this run was on June 9, 1997, on an episode of Raw Is War against Rockabilly, where he was defeated.  He disappeared from the roster afterwards.

Gunn would then have a brief stint in Pennsylvania Championship Wrestling where he won their championship from Lance Diamond on May 3, 1997. Then he would drop the title to Ace Darling on September 26, 1997.

The Midnight Express (1998)
Under his new manager Jim Cornette, Polchlopek recreated the Midnight Express tag team as "Bodacious Bart" with partner Bombastic Bob. The team had limited success, though they did hold the NWA World Tag Team Championship for a brief period in 1998.

Brawl for All and departure (1998–1999)
In 1998, Bart Gunn participated in the WWF's shootfight tournament, the Brawl for All. Gunn faced tag partner Bob Holly in the first round, and was declared the winner on points. Gunn next defeated "Dr. Death" Steve Williams, with a surprising knockout. Utilizing his enormous brute strength, Gunn defeated The Godfather in the semi-finals, and Bradshaw in the finals to win the tournament.

According to his interview in the Dark Side of the Ring episode on Brawl For All, he sat home for months following this after being told by Vince Russo that WWF creative had nothing for him at the time. Despite this, while still under WWF contract Gunn would sign with All Japan Pro Wrestling in October 1998, wrestling there for three months up until January 1999.

After returning to WWF television in February 1999, the WWF sent him to be trained by Ray Rinaldi (notable for training Marc Mero) for a WrestleMania match against Eric "Butterbean" Esch. Gunn would then briefly feud with both Holly and Williams, both angry at having been beaten in the tournament, the latter masking himself and pushing Gunn off a stage to prevent him from winning the WWF Hardcore Championship from Holly. At WrestleMania XV, Esch brutally knocked out Gunn in 35 seconds. Polchlopek was soon after released by WWF.

All Japan Pro Wrestling (1998–2002)

World Tag Team Champion (1998–2000)
While still under contract with the WWF, Polchlopek found success wrestling in Japan (due in part to his knockout of Steve Williams, who in Japan was a longtime main-eventer and held a strong reputation for his toughness). After signing with All Japan Pro Wrestling in October 1998, his debut would be announced on the November 1, 1998 edition of AJPW TV. His first in-ring match and appearance with the company was at a pay-per-view on November 14, going by his WWF ring name Bart Gunn. He would compete in the 1998 World Strongest Tag Determination League, teaming with Johnny Ace, and finishing in 4th place with 8 points. He became a member of Johnny Ace's gaijin (foreign wrestlers) stable, The Movement, and the two continued to team.

Both would regularly wrestle until January 22, 1999, when Gunn returned to the WWF to fulfil the rest of his WWF contractual obligations.

Upon being released from the WWF after WrestleMania XV, he would return to AJPW in May 1999, still maintaining fanfare and momentum even after the loss to Butterbean. On June 9, Gunn and Ace defeated Kenta Kobashi and Jun Akiyama to win the World Tag Team Championship. They held the title for a month and a half, before losing to No Fear on July 23. Following the title loss, Polchlopek stopped using the Bart Gunn name and became known as Mike Barton. In late 1999, Barton and Ace took part in the 1999 World's Strongest Tag Determination League, finishing in 5th place with 9 points.

In the spring of 2000, Barton entered the Champion Carnival, defeating Masao Inoue in the first round but losing to Takao Omori in the second. On June 9, Barton and Ace took part in a tournament for the vacant World Tag Team Championship, and lost in the first round to the eventual tournament winners, The Holy Demon Army. In the summer of 2000, Mitsuharu Misawa left All Japan to form Pro Wrestling Noah, taking most of the native talent with him. Barton, like many of the gaijin, remained in All Japan. Johnny Ace, however, left All Japan during the split and retired from wrestling, taking an office job in WCW and later the WWF.

Revenge angle with Steve Williams (2000–2001)

In December 2000, a storyline started where "Dr. Death" Steve Williams crossed paths with Barton in a tag-team television match during the World's Strongest Tag Determination League 2000 tournament. They were on opposite teams and Williams sought to get even with Barton for his loss in the Brawl For All.

The feud with Williams would culminate into a revenge match on a January 28, 2001 pay-per-view main event, which Williams won. After this, Barton and Williams would regularly wrestle against each other throughout the first half of 2001, before the two would eventually team with each other later that year in October. Jim Steele and Mike Rotunda would join them in three-way or four-way tag team matches whenever the need arose.

Teaming with Jim Steele (2000–2002)

Following the NOAH exodus, Barton formed a new tag team with Jim Steele. In October 2000, Barton entered a tournament for the vacant Triple Crown Heavyweight Championship, losing in the first round to Genichiro Tenryu. In November, Barton and Steele entered the 2000 World's Strongest Tag Determination League, finishing in 4th place with 10 points.

On January 2, 2001, Barton won the annual January 2 Korakuen Hall Battle Royal. In the spring, Barton entered the 2001 Champion Carnival, placing 5th with 13 points. By the end of 2001, Barton had begun making appearances in New Japan Pro-Wrestling as a member of the All Japan branch of Team 2000. In November 2001, Barton and Steele entered the 2001 G1 Tag League and made it to the finals, where they lost to Tencozy.

In the spring of 2002, Barton entered the 2002 Champion Carnival, making it to the finals but losing to Keiji Mutoh. On July 20, Barton and Steele won The Stan Hansen Cup Four Way against The Varsity Club, KroniK, and George Hines & Johnny Smith. On August 30, Barton and Steele challenged Kronik for the World Tag Team Championship, but lost. In the fall, Barton and Steele left All Japan. Their last match in AJPW was on October 27, 2002, where they teamed with George Hines to defeat Arashi, Nobukazu Hirai & Nobutaka Araya.

Total Nonstop Action Wrestling (2003)
Polchlopek had a short stint in Total Nonstop Action Wrestling in 2003 only lasting a month where he wrestled one match where he lost to Perry Saturn.

New Japan Pro-Wrestling (2002–2004)
After leaving All Japan, Barton and Steele signed with New Japan Pro-Wrestling (NJPW). Barton entered the 2002 New Japan Triathlon Series in November, teaming with Steele and Yuji Nagata. The team made it to the finals, but lost to Manabu Nakanishi, Osamu Nishimura and Yutaka Yoshie. In February 2003, Barton and Steele entered a #1 Contenders tournament for the IWGP Tag Team Championship. They ultimately emerged victorious, defeating Makai Club members Tadao Yasuda and Kazunari Murakami in the finals, but an injury to Steele prevented them from getting the title match. After Steele recovered, he and Barton returned to teaming. In October 2003, they entered the 2003 G1 Tag League. During the tournament, on October 21, the two received a shot at the IWGP Tag Team Title against champions Hiroshi Tanahashi and Yutaka Yoshie, but came up short. Barton and Steele finished the tournament in 5th place with 6 points.

Muga World Pro Wrestling (2006)

On September 15, 2006, Barton had his debut match in Muga World Pro Wrestling, which was a victory over Tatsutoshi Goto, then had another 4 matches in the company.  His last match in the company was a victory over Katsushi Takemura on September 25, 2006.  Afterwards, Barton left the company.

World Wrestling Entertainment (2003, 2007)

Wrestling as Mike Barton, he and Jim Steele would wrestle two tryout matches for World Wrestling Entertainment in December 2003, which were dark matches that never aired on television. They won both matches, although ultimately neither ended up signing with the WWE.

Polchlopek returned to the WWE as Bart Gunn for the December 10, 2007 edition of Raw, where he participated in the 15th Anniversary Battle Royal.  He was eliminated from the match by Steve Blackman. Afterwards, he retired from professional wrestling.

Mixed martial arts career
Polchlopek made his mixed martial arts debut against UFC veteran Wesley Correira at Rumble On The Rock: Beatdown on June 17, 2006. He won his debut via TKO after the ringside doctor determined Correira was unable to continue fighting after suffering a large cut.

In his second and final fight, on November 5, 2006, he faced Ikuhisa Minowa at PRIDE Bushido 13, losing via unanimous decision.

Mixed martial arts record

|-
| Loss
| align=center| 1–1
| Ikuhisa Minowa
| Decision (unanimous)
| Pride – Bushido 13
| 
| align=center| 2
| align=center| 5:00
| Yokohama, Kanagawa, Japan
| 
|-
| Win
| align=center| 1–0
| Wesley Correira
| TKO (cut)
| ROTR – Beatdown 1
| 
| align=center| 1
| align=center| 1:46
| Hawaii, United States
|

Personal life
Polchlopek was previously an electrician until 1993, and resumed work as an electrician 15 years later, in addition to doing home construction work. He is a grandfather.

Championships and accomplishments 
All Japan Pro Wrestling
World Tag Team Championship (1 time) – with Johnny Ace
Stan Hansen Cup (2002) – with Jim Steele
January 2 Korakuen Hall Heavyweight Battle Royal (2001)
International Wrestling Federation 
IWF World Tag Team Championship (2 times) – with Kip Winchester
New Japan Pro-Wrestling
IWGP Tag Team Championship #1 Contenders Tournament (2003) – with Jim Steele
Pennsylvania Championship Wrestling
PCW Americas Championship (2 times)
Pro Wrestling Illustrated
Ranked No. 129 of the top 500 singles wrestlers of the PWI 500 in 1997
Ranked No. 377 of the top 500 singles wrestlers of the PWI Years in 2003
World Wrestling Federation
WWF Tag Team Championship (3 times) – with Billy Gunn
NWA World Tag Team Championship (1 time) – with Bombastic Bob
Brawl for All (1998)
Raw Bowl (1996) – with Billy Gunn

References

External links 
 
 
 

1965 births
American electricians
American male mixed martial artists
Mixed martial artists utilizing wrestling
Mixed martial artists utilizing boxing
Mixed martial artists utilizing shootfighting
American male professional wrestlers
Expatriate professional wrestlers in Japan
Living people
People from Melbourne, Florida
People from Titusville, Florida
Professional wrestlers from Florida
American people of Polish descent
20th-century professional wrestlers
21st-century professional wrestlers
World Tag Team Champions (AJPW)
NWA World Tag Team Champions